Kinross is a small gold mining town in Mpumalanga, South Africa with four gold mines in the region. Village on the watershed between the Atlantic and Indian Oceans, between Devon and Trichardt, 42 km west of Bethal, 19 km east of Leslie and about 70 km north-north-east of Standerton.

History
Proclaimed a village in December 1915, it acquired municipal status about 1965. Named after Kinross in Scotland, some say by engineers constructing the Springs-Breyten railway, others by the surveyor of the town.

Kinross mining disaster
An underground fire started by an acetylene tank caused the death of 177 miners on 16 September 1986. Another 235 miners were injured in the incident, one of the largest mining incidents in South Africa.

On 16 September 1986, 177 mineworkers were killed at Kinross Mine in one of South Africa's worst mine disasters since 1946. An acetylene tank sparked flames that swept through the mining tunnel igniting plastic covering on the wiring. The flames also set fire to polyurethane foam that is used to keep walls in the mine dry. The burning plastic combined with polyurethane and churned toxic fumes that filled the shafts, choking miners to death. A welder's spark ignited plastic foam lining the walls of a tunnel, starting the fire which resulted in one of the worst disasters in mining history.

The foam is used to stop water seepage, but contains a sealant called Rigiseal which gives off poisonous fumes when it burns. The chemical was banned from use in British pits, at the time of the incident and later barred in Australia. The fire spread rapidly, and a spokesman for the mine's owners confirmed many of those killed had little chance of escaping.

"I think most of those killed succumbed to the toxic fumes in or near their place of normal work," he said. A British man working at the mine said: "They didn't stand a chance - they were trapped by the smoke."

Apart from the 177 mine workers killed, 235 were injured and one was reported missing. The Kinross mine disaster is one of the worst gold mine disasters in South African history. After the disaster, the National Union of Mineworkers (NUM) complained about low safety standards in the mines and organized a protest.

The South African National Union of Mineworkers accused the owners of Kinross of not paying enough attention to the safety of their employees. The union leader, Cyril Ramaphosa, told the BBC the disaster could have been avoided.

"We are horrified that this type of accident can take place in this day and age in the mining industry.

"In our view we are obviously back to the dark ages of mining - and there doesn't seem to be much improvement in safety standards," he said.

South Africa's gold mines were notoriously dangerous workplaces for the country's mainly black miners. The men were usually unskilled and had to work at depths of up to 12,000 feet (3,658 m) and temperatures reaching 30 °C. Between 1900 and 1993, 69,000 mineworkers died in accidents and more than one million were seriously injured.

Kinross mine was heavily criticised for not announcing the disaster until hours after it happened, and for identifying the dead black miners by ethnic group only. The Congress of South Africans Trade Unions established a national health and safety day in recognition of the tragedy. On 1 October 1986, mine workers staged one of the largest protests in country. Workers stayed away from work and others held memorial services to mourn those who died in the mine accident.

Other mine accidents that killed a large number of people include the 1960 Coalbrook Mine accident with 437 fatalities. Next was the Orkney Mine accident at the Vaal Reefs Mine in 1995 that killed 104 mine workers, followed by a methane gas explosion that killed 39 workers at the Trans Natal Corporation. An estimated 6800 mine workers have been killed through mine accidents and more than 1 million were permanently disabled between 1900 and 1991. In August 2012, 44 people were killed, including 34 mineworkers who were killed in Marikana, North West, following an unprotected strike.

References 

Populated places in the Govan Mbeki Local Municipality
Mining communities in South Africa
Mining disasters in South Africa
Populated places established in 1915
1986 mining disasters
1986 in South Africa
1986 disasters in South Africa